David Mefin Davies (born 2 September 1972) is a Welsh former rugby union player who played as a hooker for the Ospreys and the Wales national rugby union team.

He made his international debut on 8 June 2002 at Cape Town, South Africa. He was a member of the Wales team that won the 2005 Six Nations Championship and Grand Slam.

Davies captained Pontypridd RFC and Wales A, he also played for the Celtic Warriors, Gloucester and  Leicester.

In March 2010, he signed for the Ospreys on a two-year deal.

In June 2012 Davies was appointed Head Coach of Swansea RFC.

On 1 July 2014, he joined the backroom coaching staff at Worcester Warriors, primarily focusing on developing the academy's forwards but also assisting with the senior clubs pack.

References

External links
Leicester profile
Wales profile
Pontypridd RFC profile
Scrum.com stats
Sporting Heroes

Wales international rugby union players
1972 births
Living people
Leicester Tigers players
Gloucester Rugby players
Ospreys (rugby union) players
Rugby union players from Carmarthenshire
Rugby union hookers